Franz Rautek (1902–1989) was a martial arts teacher in Vienna, Austria. He is best known as the inventor of the rescue maneuver named after him. This maneuver allows unconscious people to be moved from areas of danger with limited effort on part of the rescuer, even if he is much smaller than the victim.

Bring the victim into a sitting position, making sure that both legs are free. Approach him from behind, putting both your arms under his armpits. Both your hands then grab one of the lower arms of the victim with all fingers and the thumbs being placed on top of that lower arm and parallel to each other (so called monkey grip). This avoids injury to the ribs of the victim by the thumb of the rescuer. The victim's arm should now be horizontal and pressed across his chest. Gently lifting the upper body of the victim by the grabbed arm and supporting him with your thigh, you can now drag him backwards. The victim contacts the ground with buttocks and legs, which are not "soft parts". If a second rescuer is available, he can carry the legs.

There are obvious dangers for victims with spinal injuries or osteoporosis, therefore victims should be moved only if the situation absolutely requires it (e.g., in a fire). Rescuers also should move slowly and deliberately to avoid self-injury. Do not stumble while walking backwards!

References
Ziegenfuß: Notfallmedizin. Springer, 4th ed., 2007. 

First aid
1902 births
1989 deaths